The Royal State Palace is a palace in the city of Jeddah, Saudi Arabia. It was designed for King Fahd of Saudi Arabia by the Japanese architect Kenzo Tange. It was completed in 1982.
The palace is 14,000 sq meters in size internally and is spread over a 65,000 sq meter site. The palace has two storeys and a basement.

Donald Leslie Johnson in his 2013 book Makers of 20th-Century Modern Architecture: A Bio-Critical Sourcebook describes Tange's "formality and monumental scale are statements highly suggestive of the authoritarianism of Samuri culture", a formalism as "most suitable" for projects such as the palace and suggests Tange's formalism was influenced by his early years growing up in Imperial Japan.

The palace was used by Tange as the inspiration for his design for the Presidential Complex in Abuja, Nigeria, the two buildings share with the "facade, the hallway and the composition" of the two buildings reading "identically" in appearance.

References

1982 establishments in Saudi Arabia
Buildings and structures completed in 1982
Kenzo Tange buildings
Buildings and structures in Jeddah
Palaces in Saudi Arabia
Modernist architecture